Amy Wilson-Hardy (born 13 September 1991) is an English rugby union player. She made her debut for the England women's national rugby union team in 2013. She was selected as a member of the Great Britain women's national rugby sevens team to the 2016 Summer Olympics.

She plays for Wasps in the Women's Premiership. She was selected for the 2017 Women's Rugby World Cup squad.

She won a bronze medal at the 2018 Commonwealth Games.

References

External links 
 RFU Player Profile
 

1991 births
Living people
Female rugby sevens players
Rugby sevens players at the 2016 Summer Olympics
English rugby sevens players
Olympic rugby sevens players of Great Britain
Great Britain national rugby sevens team players
Rugby sevens players at the 2018 Commonwealth Games
Commonwealth Games bronze medallists for England
Commonwealth Games medallists in rugby sevens
Team Bath rugby union players
England international women's rugby sevens players
Wasps Women rugby players
Medallists at the 2018 Commonwealth Games